The Men's 100m T35 had its Final held on September 13 at 18:00.

Medalists

Results

References
Final

Athletics at the 2008 Summer Paralympics